Walter Seltzer (November 7, 1914 – February 18, 2011) was an American film producer. He sat on the Motion Picture & Television Fund Board of Trustees, and was honored with the Silver Medallion for Humanitarian Achievement by the group in 1986.

Biography
Seltzer was born to a Jewish family in Philadelphia, Pennsylvania and attended the University of Pennsylvania from 1932 to 1934. He had two brothers: Frank N. Seltzer, a producer; and Julian Seltzer, an advertising director for Hal Roach Studios and later 20th Century Fox. Seltzer served four years in the U.S. Marine Corps during World War II.

Filmography
He was a producer in all films unless otherwise noted.

Film

Television

Death
He died at the Motion Picture and Television Fund home in Woodland Hills, California on February 18, 2011, aged 96, from pneumonia.

References

External links
 

1914 births
2011 deaths
Film producers from Pennsylvania
20th-century American Jews
Businesspeople from Philadelphia
People from Greater Los Angeles
Deaths from pneumonia in California
20th-century American businesspeople
21st-century American Jews